The L5 Society was founded in 1975 by Carolyn Meinel and Keith Henson to promote the space colony ideas of Gerard K. O'Neill.

In 1987, the L5 Society merged with the National Space Institute to form the National Space Society.

Name

L4 and L5 are points of stable gravitational equilibrium located along the path of the Moon's orbit, 60 degrees ahead or behind it.

History

Founding of L5 Society

O'Neill's first published paper on the subject, "The Colonization of Space", appeared in the magazine Physics Today in September 1974. A number of people who later became leaders of the L5 Society got their first exposure to the idea from this article. Among these were a couple from Tucson, Arizona, Carolyn Meinel and Keith Henson. The Hensons corresponded with O'Neill and were invited to present a paper on "Closed Ecosystems of High Agricultural Yield" at the 1975 Princeton Conference on Space Manufacturing Facilities, which was organized by O'Neill.

At this conference, O'Neill merged the Solar Power Satellite (SPS) ideas of Peter Glaser with his space habitat concepts.

The Hensons incorporated the L5 Society in August 1975, and sent its first 4-page newsletter in September to a sign up list from the conference and  O'Neill's mailing list. The first newsletter included a letter of support from Morris Udall (then a contender for US president) and said "our clearly stated long range goal will be to disband the Society in a mass meeting at L5."

Moon Treaty

The peak of L5's influence was the defeat of the Moon Treaty in the U.S. Senate in 1980 ("... L-5 took on the biggest political fight of its short life, and won"). Specifically, L5 Society activists campaigned for awareness of the provisions against any form of sovereignty or private property in outer space that would make space colonization impossible and the provisions against any alteration of the environment of any celestial body prohibiting terraforming.  Leigh Ratiner [a Washington lawyer/lobbyist] "played the key role in the lobbying effort, although he had energetic help from L-5 activists, notably Eric Drexler and Christine Peterson."

Although economic analysis indicated the SPS/space colony concept had merit, it foundered on short political and economic horizons and the fact that the transport cost to space was about 300 times too high for individuals to fund when compared to the Plymouth Rock and Mormon colonies.

Merger with National Space Institute

In 1986, the L5 Society, which had grown to about 10,000 members, merged with the 25,000 member National Space Institute, to form the present-day National Space Society.  The National Space Institute had been founded in 1972 by Wernher von Braun, the former German rocket engineer of the WW II  Nazi V-2 rocket/ballistic missile program, and of NASA's Marshall Space Flight Center and Project Apollo program manager.

While the L5 Society failed to achieve the goal of human settlements in space, it served as a focal point for many of the people who later became known in fields such as nanotechnology, memetics, extropianism, cryonics, transhumanism, artificial intelligence, and tether propulsion, such as K. Eric Drexler, Robert Forward, and Hans Moravec.

L5 News

The L5 News was the newsletter of the L5 Society reporting on space habitat development and related space issues. The L5 News was published from September 1975 until April 1987, when the merger with the National Space Institute was completed and the newly formed National Space Society began publication of its own magazine, Ad Astra.

See also
List of objects at Lagrangian points
Home on Lagrange (The L5 Song)
Planetary chauvinism

References

External links
NSS.org: Official NSS−National Space Society website
NSS.org: Ad Astra Online — online edition of Ad Astra magazine.
NSS Worldwide website
Chapters.nss.org: National Space Society Chapters Network Resources for NSS chapters, members and space activists.
NSS Chapters Story
1979 UN Declaration on the Moon (Moon Treaty)
L5 News index 
 
NSS.org: 1975 
NSS.org: 1976 
NSS.org: 1977 
NSS.org: 1978 
NSS.org: 1979 
NSS.org: 1980s 

Space organizations
Space advocacy organizations
Space colonization
International scientific organizations
Scientific societies based in the United States
1975 in science
Organizations established in 1975
Organizations disestablished in 1987
1975 establishments in the United States
1987 disestablishments in the United States